Rosanna Pansino is an American YouTuber, actress, author and singer. Pansino is one of the highest-paid content-creators on YouTube, and was listed first on Forbes Top Influencers: Food list in 2017.

Pansino has hosted the internet series Nerdy Nummies since 2011, which won her a Shorty Award and earned her five Streamy Award nominations. She has written and published two cookbooks based on the series, as well as releasing a baking line.

Pansino starred in the web series Broken Quest in 2013, and the YouTube Premium series Escape the Night in 2018 and 2019, the latter of which earned her two Streamy Award nominations. In 2021, she has hosted the HBO Max series Baketopia.

Pansino released her debut single "Perfect Together" in 2015; she is a classically trained singer.

Early life
Rosanna Pansino was born  in Seattle, King County, Washington, where she was raised alongside her sister Molly Lu. She is of Italian, Croatian, German, and Irish ancestry. Throughout her childhood, she was known by friends and family as a "nerdy" and "awkward" kid, and in school, she struggled with dyslexia. She originally wanted to become an actress, and after attending Pacific Lutheran University, she moved to Los Angeles to pursue acting. At one stage, Pansino was a teacher.

Pansino's interest in cooking was inspired by her father and grandmother, and she stated in 2014 that "...baking has always been a hobby of mine. I have always loved being creative with my food and making themed sweets for my friends." On December 17, 2019, Pansino announced throughout her social media outlets that her father, who appeared in several of her videos, had died due to leukemia, which he had been fighting for six years.

Career

YouTube work 
Pansino began her YouTube channel in 2009 after she was encouraged by a few of her friends who had also worked on YouTube, and had started making videos to get more comfortable in front of a camera. After her early baking videos gained a steady following, viewers eventually started to request more. Because she had never seen a baking show on television or the Internet, Pansino decided to create the Nerdy Nummies series. She later revealed that in her early years of YouTube while she had still worked as an actress that she had to choose between acting or YouTube, the ultimatum given by her agent. She remained adamant that she would not quit YouTube, despite the risks being taken at the time. Pansino told Cosmopolitan in 2015: " At this point, I wasn't making any money on YouTube. I knew that it was possible to do that but I wasn't making a dime. I decided, I'm going to do this. I'm not going to let YouTube go."

Nerdy Nummies quickly became a hit, and it brought Pansino much recognition and acclaim. As of November 2022, her channel has attained over 4.2 billion views and 14 million subscribers, making it the most popular cooking channel on YouTube. She has since received several accolades; in 2013, she won the Shorty Award for Best Foodie, Chef or Food Lover in Social Media. She has also received five Streamy Award nominations for her work on Nerdy Nummies. According to Forbes, Pansino has remained one of the highest-paid YouTubers, reporting her to have made seven figures each year through sponsorships and advertisements. Commenting on her success in an interview with Business Insider in 2014, she stated: "I've never thought about how to make a video go viral. From the very beginning I have always wanted to use YouTube to better myself and share things I enjoy with the world. If others want to join me on that journey I am happy to have them as viewers."

Pansino has been noted for her consistent upload schedule, not having missed a single date since creating her channel. She stated in an interview with Forbes that "I don't want to miss an upload; I'm just not going to do that to my community, they've shown up for me and been so supportive of me, and in exchange I've been there for them—there's always going to be a video waiting for them on Saturday. It's this relationship and bond that I never wanted to break and I'm really proud that I haven't because it has been difficult at times." For the upcoming future, she said that she hoped to "be making baking videos until I'm 90 years old."

Other ventures 
Pansino made her first appearance on television as a contestant on Season 2 of VH1's Scream Queens, a reality series in which the prize was a role in one of the Saw films; she ended in 9th place. Following this, Pansino appeared in small roles on shows such as Parks and Recreation and CSI: Crime Scene Investigation. She voiced the role of Violet in the animated web series Broken Quest in 2013.

In 2015, she made a cameo in the music video for "Dessert" by Dawin ft Silentó. She also released her first single, entitled "Perfect Together" in 2015, which was produced by Kurt Hugo Schneider. Also in 2015, Pansino wrote and published The Nerdy Nummies Cookbook, which was officially released that same year. The book includes selected recipes previously featured on Nerdy Nummies, along with previously featured recipes have been remastered. The book became a New York Times best seller, and has been listed by BookRiot on a list of "50 Must-Read Books by YouTubers".

In 2016, she had a recurring voice role for the television series Emo Dad, and also guest starred in the Disney Channel series Bizaardvark as herself. In August 2017, Pansino released a baking line in collaboration with cooking company Wilton. The set ranges from cooking tools and products intended more for the use of beginners, with the items including measurements and guides on each. It was released to a massive number of retailers, including Walmart and Michael's. In 2018, she released new items to further extend her line. Also in 2018, Pansino released another cookbook, entitled Baking All Year Round, which was based on the same concept of her previous cookbook. Pansino starred in the third season of YouTube Red's Escape the Night as The Jet Setter in 2018, and in the fourth season as The Socialite in 2019. Pansino and the rest of the cast for both the third and fourth season were nominated for Streamy Awards.

In 2019, she made an appearance as a guest judge on Netflix original competitive-baking show Nailed It!. In 2020, she appeared on YouTuber Lauren Riihimaki's show Craftopia. In 2021, Pansino hosted the HBO Max series Baketopia, where contestants compete in a bake-off to win up to $10,000; her hosting work on the show has received praise, and she has also executive-produced several episodes. That same year, she was among several other YouTubers who appeared in MrBeast's "$1,000,000 Influencer Tournament". In 2023, she guest-starred as a wedding planner on NCIS: Los Angeles, which she described as a "dream come true".

Personal life
Pansino currently resides in Los Angeles, where she films all her YouTube videos. In 2018, Pansino announced that she is in a relationship with Mike Lamond, better known as Husky, a former E-sports commentator who currently works with Pansino on Nerdy Nummies. In her 2019 Valentine's Day video, she stated that they've worked together for nine years and have been dating for six years.

In 2019, Pansino was admitted to a local hospital after complaining of severe pain and illness. It was then later revealed that she'd caught a life-threatening bacterial infection, which was treated immediately. The news was announced on her Twitter account. In February 2021, she underwent a removal of her breast implants, which was announced on her Instagram. Pansino discussed her reason for choosing to remove her implants a year later in a YouTube video.

Filmography

Film

Television

Music video 

 "Dessert" (2015), by Dawin ft Silentó

Video game 

 Cookie Run: Kingdom (2021), Carrot Cookie

Discography

Singles

Bibliography
 The Nerdy Nummies Cookbook (2015)
 Baking All Year Round (2018)

Awards and nominations

References

External links

Rosanna Pansino channel website

Living people
Actresses from Seattle
American bakers
American cookbook writers
American people of Croatian descent
American people of German descent
American people of Irish descent
American writers of Italian descent
American YouTubers
Food and cooking YouTubers
Gaming YouTubers
Actors with dyslexia
Writers with dyslexia
Shorty Award winners
Women cookbook writers
YouTube channels launched in 2009
21st-century American non-fiction writers
21st-century American women writers
American women non-fiction writers
Writers from Seattle
Year of birth missing (living people)